Love is an English language surname predominant, in Great British terms, in the west of Scotland.

It is derived from "Luiff", which came from "Wolf".

It may be spelling without diacritics of names such as Löve.

Notable people with the surname include:

In sports
 Bob Love (born 1942), American basketball player
 Bryce Love (born 1997), American football player
 Colin Love (born 1945), Australian rugby league football administrator
 Davis Love III (born 1964), American golfer
 Donald Love (born 1994), Scottish footballer; defender for Sunderland
 Glenn Love (born 1989), American football player
 Harry Love (cricketer) (1871–1942), English cricketer
 Ian Love (born 1958), Welsh footballer
 Jesse Love (born 2005), American racing driver
 Joanne Love (born 1985), Scottish footballer
 John Love (1924–2005), Rhodesian race car driver.
 Jordan Love (born 1998), American football player
 Josh Love (born 1996), American football player
 Julian Love (born 1998), American football player
 Kevin Love (born 1988), American basketball player
 Kyle Love (born 1986), American football player
 Mike Love (defensive lineman) (born 1994), American football player
 Ricky Love, American basketball player
 Stan Love (born 1949), American basketball player; father of Kevin Love and brother of Beach Boys member Mike Love
 Vágner Love (born 1984), Brazilian footballer
 Yeardley Love (1987–2010), American women's lacrosse player and murder victim

In music
 Airrion Love (born 1968), American singer (member of The Stylistics)
 Courtney Love (born 1964), American musician and actress 
 Darlene Love (born 1941), American singer
 D. Wayne Love, British vocalist with the Alabama 3 (A3 in the US)
 G. Love (born 1972), stage name of Garrett Dutton III, American musician
 Geoff Love (1917–1991), British musician
 Gerard Love bass player and songwriter with Teenage Fanclub
 Kylie Sonique Love (born 1983), American drag queen, singer, dancer and reality television personality
 Larry Love, British vocalist with the Alabama 3 (A3 in the US)
 Mary Love (1943–2013), American soul and gospel singer
 Mike Love (born 1941), American singer-songwriter and founding member of The Beach Boys
 Monie Love (born 1970), stage name of Simone Wilson or Simone Gooden, British singer, emcee and radio personality
 Patrick Love (born 1968), American gospel musician
 Rico Love (born 1982), American rapper and record producer
 Shirley Love (born 1940), American opera singer

In entertainment
 Adrian Love (1944–1999), British radio presenter
 Angelina Love, the best-known ring name of Lauren Ann Williams (born 1981), Canadian wrestler
 Bessie Love (1898–1986), American actress
 Brandi Love, stage name for Tracey Lynn Livermore (born 1973), an American pornographic actress
 Brother Love, stage name for Bruce Prichard (born 1963), a professional wrestling personality
 Darris Love, (born 1980), American actor
 Dude Love, a ring name of Mick Foley (born 1965), American wrestler
 Gary Love (born 1964), British actor and film director
 Harry Love (animator) (1911–1997), American animator
 Kermit Love (1916–2008), American puppeteer, costume designer and actor
 Nick Love (born 1969), English film director and writer
 Pauline Joless Love (1914–2001), American actress better known as Pauline Moore
 Willie Love (1906–1953), American Delta blues pianist

In science and technology
 Augustus Edward Hough Love (1863–1940), British mathematician
 David Love (geologist) (1913–2002), American field geologist
 David J. Love (born 1979), American professor of engineering
 Robert Love (born 1981), American open-source software developer, author and speaker
 Stanley G. Love (born 1965), American scientist and NASA astronaut

In the military
 General Sir Frederick Love (1789–1866), British Army officer and Lieutenant Governor of Jersey
 George M. Love (1831–1837), American Civil War Medal of Honor recipient
 Harry Love (lawman) (1810–1868), head of California's first law enforcement agency
 John Love (1820–1881) – United States Army Major General (Indiana) during and after the Mexican–American War
 John K. Love American Lt Gen (three-star) Marine Corps General serving with NATO
 Nancy Harkness Love (1914–1976), American pilot, commander of Women's Auxiliary Ferrying Squadron in World War II
 Robert Love (soldier) (1760–1845), American Revolutionary War soldier and political leader
 Robert J. Love, American pilot, Korean War flying ace

In politics and law
 John Arthur Love (1916–2002), American politician, governor of the State of Colorado
 Mia Love (born 1975), American politician
 Milton Sydney Love (1852–1924), magistrate in New South Wales, Australia
 Peter Early Love (1818–1866), American politician, lawyer, jurist
 Ralph Love (1907–1994), New Zealand politician and activist
 Reggie Love (born 1981), personal aide to U.S. President Barack Obama
 Samuel B. Love, Florida politician
 Sandra Love (1945–2018), American politician
 Shirley Love (politician), (1933–2020), American politician and radio broadcaster
 William Love (disambiguation), several people, including
 William Love (Australian politician) (1810–1885), New South Wales MLA
 William Love (London MP) (c. 1620–1689), for City of London (UK Parliament constituency)
 William Carter Love (1784–1835), U.S. Representative from North Carolina 
 William F. Love (1850–1898), U.S. Representative from Mississippi
 William L. Love (born 1872), New York politician
 William D. Love (1859–1933) United States Tax Court judge

In religion and philosophy
 Rev. John Love, D.D. (1757–1825), Noted Church of Scotland preacher and author.
 Richard Love (1596–1661), English churchman and academic

Others
 Bernice Love, unmarried name of Bernice Love Wiggins (1897–1936), Texas poet
 Buddy Love, the villain in the film The Nutty Professor and its remake
 George H. Love (1900–1991), American businessperson
 Hamilton Love (1875–1922), lumberman and sportswriter
 Horace Beevor Love (1800–1838), British portrait painter 
 Iris Love (1933–2020), American archaeologist
 Layla Love (born 1980), American photographer
 Peter Love (executed 1610), English pirate
 Samuel G. Love (1821–1893), American educationist
 Tom Love (1937–2023), American entrepreneur

See also
 Löve (disambiguation) 
 Løve (disambiguation)

References

English-language surnames